"Don't Call Me Baby" is a pop–R&B song performed by Canadian singer Kreesha Turner for her debut studio album, Passion (2008). The track was released as the album's third single in May 2008 in Canada. It has since peaked at #8 on the Canadian Hot 100. The track was later released in the United States in June 2008 and went on to peak at #1 on the Hot Dance Club Play chart.

In 2022 the song was used as a Lip Sync for Your Life number in a third season episode of Canada's Drag Race.

Track listing
Canadian Digital single
 Don't Call Me Baby (Radio Mix)

US Digital single
 Don't Call Me Baby (Top 40 Mix)

Other Versions
(Digital Dog Club Mix)
(Digital Dog Radio Edit)
(Bimbo Jones Club Mix)
(Bimbo Jones Radio Edit)

Release history

Charts

Weekly charts

Year-end charts

References

External links

 https://web.archive.org/web/20090412211804/http://www.cria.ca/gold/1008_g.php

2008 singles
Kreesha Turner songs
Songs written by Jon Levine
Song recordings produced by Jon Levine
Songs written by Anjulie
2008 songs
EMI Records singles